Vernon Hilton Heywood (24 December 1927 – September 2022) was a British biologist.  He specialised in medicinal and aromatic plants, and the conservation of wild relatives of plants.

Heywood was appointed as lecturer at University of Liverpool, UK in 1955, promoted to senior lecturer in 1960 and to reader in 1963. He was awarded the second established Chair in Botany in 1964 and left Liverpool in 1968.

He was Professor of Botany and Head of Department at the University of Reading until 1987 when he became founder and director of Botanic Gardens Conservation International (BGCI).

In 1987 he was awarded the Linnean Medal of the Linnean Society of London. Planta Europa honored him with their Linnaeus award at their fifth conference, held in 2007 in Cluj Napoca. The book Taxonomy and Plant Conservation (Cambridge University Press, 2006, Etelka Leadlay and Stephen Jury, eds.) was dedicated as a tribute to Heywood in honor of his 75th birthday.

His publications include several major books including Principles of angiosperm taxonomy (1963), Flowering Plants of the World, and its update Flowering Plant Families of the World (with Richard K. Brummitt, Alastair Culham and Ole Seberg) as well as the Global Biodiversity Assessment.

References

Bibliography

External links
 Heywood's publications from Amazon.com

1927 births
2022 deaths
Linnean Medallists
Academics of the University of Reading
British botanists